Xiangzhou District is a district of the city of Xiangyang, Hubei, People's Republic of China. The district itself was formerly known as Xiangyang. It was a city famous for the siege of Xiangyang (1267–1273) by invading forces of the Mongol-founded Yuan Dynasty. It was also an important city during the period of the Three Kingdoms, in the Romance of the Three Kingdoms it was said that it was nearby Xiangyang that Zhuge Liang received his three visits from Liu Bei. Xiangyang was also where Sun Jian fought Liu Biao in 191 AD during the Three Kingdoms. Today, Xiangzhou has been incorporated with nearby Fancheng to form the prefecture-level city of Xiangyang, part of Hubei province.

Administrative divisions
Subdistricts:
Zhangwan Subdistrict, Liuji Subdistrict, Xiaowan Subdistrict, Liulianghe Subdistrict

Towns:
Longwang, Shiqiao, Huangji, Huopai, Guyi, Zhuji, Chenghe, Shuanggou, Zhangjiaji, Huanglong, Yushan, Dongjin, Mizhuang

Transportation
Xiangyang East railway station is located in the district and is an interchange between multiple high-speed lines.

See also
 Zhang Ji (poet from Hubei)

References

External links
 Xiangzhou Government Website

Ancient Chinese cities
Xiangyang